The World Assembly of Youth (WAY); French: Assemblée Mondiale de la Jeunesse, Spanish: Asamblea Mundial de la Juventud is the international coordinating body of national youth councils and national youth organisations. The full members of WAY are national youth councils. WAY currently has 140 member organisations from all continents. As the international coordinating body of national youth councils, WAY has special consultative status with the United Nations, the highest status possible for a non-governmental organization. WAY co-operates with the UN and many of its special agencies, particularly with UNAIDS, UNEP, ILO, UNESCO, UNFPA, UNICEF, UNDP, UNCTAD and WHO.

The World Assembly of Youth recognises the Universal Declaration of Human Rights as the basis of its action and services. WAY promotes the work of youth organisations in areas such as: democracy, environment, human rights, population, health, drugs, community development, leadership training, and cultural and religious tolerance. It provides opportunities for youth representatives from different countries to exchange ideas and experiences, to coordinate programme plans, and to reach a better understanding of each other's problems due to differences in racial, religious, and national backgrounds.

The regional structure of the National Youth Councils in all the continents, Asian Youth Council, European Youth Forum, Caribbean Youth Forum, Forum for the Integration of Asean Youth, Pacific Youth Council, Arab Youth Union, Pan-African Youth Union, African-Arab Youth Council, SADC Youth Movement, are consultative members.

The WAY Headquarters is located in World Youth Complex in Melaka, Malaysia having been previously established in London, Paris, Brussels, Copenhagen, and Kuala Lumpur. The organization is financed from annual membership fees and voluntary contributions from its member organisations, and has three official languages: English, French, and Spanish.

History 

In 1949, an initiative was undertaken to establish a youth organisation to promote global cooperation and understanding amongst the young people of the world. Recognising the need for a universal youth organisation, youth leaders from national youth councils of all member countries of the United Nations were invited to attend an international conference in London. In August 1949, the international conference held at Westminster Hall in London established the World Assembly of Youth.

The draft charter, which had been prepared in February 1949 in Ashbridge, England, was ratified at the first official meeting of WAY in Brussels a year later. The meeting, organised by the Belgian Youth Council, was attended by more than 100 young people from 37 countries. The WAY Charter was ratified by 29 of the national youth councils present, and WAY began its work on behalf of the world youth community.

The WAY headquarters has moved throughout the years to various bases including Brussels, Paris, London and Copenhagen. In 1999, the WAY headquarters moved to Kuala Lumpur, Malaysia and now has finally established its headquarters building, the World Youth Complex, in Melaka, a southern state of Malaysia.

Past leadership

Presidents

Secretary Generals

Activities

The World Assembly of Youth has two main tasks:

To represent its members towards international organisations and institutions and promote the work of voluntary youth organisations all over the world. WAY deals with all issues affecting youth in international, regional, and local level.

WAY organises events on global, regional, and national levels. These events are often carried out in cooperation with other international youth organisations, regional youth structures or national affiliates. WAY's representatives participate in various UN working groups and other meetings promoting youth issues and the interests of member organisations.

Aims

 Increase inter-ethnic respect and to foster inter-cultural and international understanding and cooperation.
 Facilitate the collection of information about the needs and problems of youth.
 Disseminate information about the methods, techniques and activities of youth organisations.
 Promote the interchange of ideas between youth of all countries.
 Assist in the development of youth activities and to promote, by mutual aid, the extension of the work of voluntary youth organizations.
 Cooperate in the development of national youth councils of voluntary youth organizations.
 Establish and maintain relations with the international organisations, both voluntary and governmental.
 Support and encourage the national movements of non-self governing countries in their struggle for national liberation.
 Promote tolerance, understanding, solidarity and cooperation among young men and women irrespective of race, sex, language, religion or political orientation.
 Encourage the full participation of young men and women in the development process of their countries.
 Improve the equality between young men and women.
 Promote the democratic participation of young people both in their own organisations and in the life of society as a whole.
 Act as a representative body of national youth councils to the UN and other appropriate governmental and non-governmental international bodies.

Main organs

General Assembly

The paramount body of WAY is the General Assembly, which determines the policies and programmes of the organisation. The General Assembly is convened every four years, and votes on the admission of new members and the adoption of policies. The General Assembly also elects the officers who are charged with the responsibility of implementing WAY's programmes. The officers include the Bureau and the Executive Committee.

Bureau

The Bureau consists of WAY's President and five Vice Presidents, who are elected at the General Assembly. The Bureau meets between meetings of the Executive Committee to review and supervise the work of the Secretariat.

Current members

Executive committee

The Executive Committee has 13 members. The present members are of 13 different nationalities from North and South, East and West. The Executive Committee is charged with the general administration of WAY and the implementation of programmes drawn up by the General Assembly. The Executive Committee meets at least once a year.

Current members

Secretariat

The Secretariat headed by the Secretary General Ms. Ediola Pashollari and support staff, carry out the daily work of the organisation in accordance with the guidelines established by the General Assembly and its elected bodies. The Secretariat of WAY is located in Melaka, Malaysia .

Members
The World Assembly of Youth currently has 140 member organisations. There are four membership status granted by the Executive Committee at each General Assembly. These status are: Full, Associate, Observer, and Consultative. In accordance with Article IV and V of the WAY Charter, membership of WAY is granted as follows:

Full members of WAY are national youth councils which are representing a cross section of democratic, voluntary youth organisations in a country or territory, and which have ratified the Charter and are admitted by the Assembly by a vote of the majority of its members.

The Assembly has the power to admit national youth councils or national youth organisations, which are interested in regular co-operation with WAY, as associated members, provided that a member national youth councils of WAY does not already exist in the country in question.

Regional youth organisations with national youth councils as members may be provided consultative status. They shall be permanent invitees to the meetings of the Bureau and the Executive Committee without the right to vote.

The Executive Committee may admit international organisations, national youth councils and national youth organisations as observers, provided that a member national youth council does not exist in the country in question.

Africa

Asia

Caribbean

Europe

Latin America

Pacific

North America

Consultative

Volunteer Programme

The World Assembly of Youth has established a volunteers programme that seeks to develop a dedicated corps of young people who will be willing to assist in WAY programmes and activities around the world.

World Youth Institute 

WAY established the World Youth Institute (WYI), with main function as a vehicle for education and training of young people around the world. The World Youth Institute is geared to be a leading institution for empowerment and capacity building through education, training, and development programmes.

See also 
World Federation of Democratic Youth
International Student Conference
International Union of Students

References

External links
Official site
 World Assembly of Youth's electronic group - worldyouth@yahoogroups.com

International organisations based in London
International organisations based in Malaysia
Youth organizations established in 1949
Youth organisations based in England
Youth organisations based in Malaysia